Crambus kuzakaiensis is a moth in the family Crambidae. It was described by Okano in 1960. It is found in Japan.

References

Crambini
Moths described in 1960
Moths of Japan